Diāna Marcinkēviča and Daniela Seguel were the defending champions, but Seguel chose not to participate. 

Marcinkēviča partnered alongside Alexandra Cadanțu, but lost in the final to Cristina Bucșa and María Fernanda Herazo, 4–6, 6–1, [10–8].

Seeds

Draw

External links
Main Draw

L'Open 35 de Saint-Malo - Doubles
L'Open Emeraude Solaire de Saint-Malo
L'Open 35 de Saint-Malo